Pleasant View is a city on the northern edge of Weber County, Utah, United States. The population was 7,979 at the 2010 census. It is part of the Ogden–Clearfield, Utah Metropolitan Statistical Area. It is a suburban community of Ogden.

History
Considered part of North Ogden for its first 30 years, Pleasant View was known during its early days by several names, including West District, Hot Springs District, Stringtown, or simply Out West. The city was officially named Pleasant View in 1882 by Wilford Cragun, one of the first white children born in the area. Mary Lake, daughter of William Bailey Lake and Sarah Jane Marler was born in North Ogden, 15 December 1851. Other early settlers were Thomas Dunn, John Mower, and Simeon Cragun families.

Geography

Demographics

At the 2010 census there were 7,979 people in 2,438 households, including 2,086 families, in the city. The population density was 837.2 people per square mile (323.1/km). There were 2,548 housing units at an average density of 281.7 per square mile (108.7/km). The racial makeup of the city was 93.1% White, 0.4% African American, 0.2% Native American, 0.9% Asian, 0.4% Pacific Islander, 3.1% from other races, and 1.9% from two or more races. Hispanic or Latino of any race were 7.3%.

Of the 2,438 households 39.1% had children under the age of 18 living with them, 74.4% were married couples living together, 7.6% had a female householder with no husband present, and 14.4% were non-families. 11.9% of households were one person and 5.4% were one person aged 65 or older. The average household size was 3.27 and the average family size was 3.57.

The age distribution was 32.9% under the age of 18, 7.9% from 18 to 24, 22.3% from 25 to 44, 25.2% from 45 to 64, and 11.7% 65 or older. The median age was 34.1 years. For every 100 females, there were 100.4 males. For every 100 females age 18 and over, there were 99.7 males.

The median household income was $62,123 and the median family income  was $66,542. Males had a median income of $41,568 versus $30,308 for females. The per capita income for the city was $22,694. About 1.6% of families and 2.6% of the population were below the poverty line, including 3.9% of those under age 18 and none of those age 65 or over.

Points of interest
The area became a popular tourist stop because of the natural hot springs located in its north western corner that lies adjacent to Box Elder County. The Utah Hot Springs Resort was created at the site in the 1880s. During its peak, the facility offered visitors bathing and swimming pools, a hotel with 40 rooms, a dance hall, and a saloon where a mug of beer could be bought for five cents. The facility no longer exists.

Since 2008 until 2018 (until future line extension), the Pleasant View station has been (although for limited service) the northern end of Utah Transit Authority's commuter rail service, the FrontRunner.

See also

 List of cities and towns in Utah

References

External links

 

 
Cities in Utah
Cities in Weber County, Utah
Ogden–Clearfield metropolitan area
Populated places established in 1850